Susan River is a rural locality in the Fraser Coast Region, Queensland, Australia.

Geography
Susan River (the watercourse) enters the locality from the west and flows through to the east where it enters the Mary River. Stockyard Creek enters from the north and flows south-east to join the Susan. The river mouth is split, surrounding Kangaroo Island and Power Island, both of which are in the locality. Several tidal branches join the river near the mouth.

Road infrastructure
Maryborough–Hervey Bay Road (State Route 57) runs through from south-west to north-west.

References 

Fraser Coast Region
Localities in Queensland